Ali Coulibaly (r. 1757 – c. 1759) was a king of the Bambara Empire of Ségou.

Son of empire founder Bitòn Coulibaly and brother to the previous king, Dinkoro Coulibaly, Ali took the throne following his brother's assassination.  A devout Muslim, he attempted to convert his largely animist Bambara subjects.  Ali became widely unpopular for his interference with local religious practices and his ban on millet beer.  His death triggered a decade of instability in the Bambara Empire until the 1766 ascension of Ngolo Diarra to the throne.

References
This article is based on a translation of the corresponding article from the French Wikipedia, retrieved on October 23, 2005.

Malian Muslims
History of Mali
Bamana Empire
18th-century monarchs in Africa
Year of death unknown
Year of birth unknown